Chaetopsis canovae is a species of fungus in the genus Chaetopsis.

References 

Ascomycota